Jamal Mustafa Abdullah  (born 4 May 1955) was a deputy in charge of the file for tribes and clans in Saddam Hussein's government and Hala Saddam Hussein's husband.

After 2003
His name was included in the list of Iraqis wanted by the United States at number 22. He was arrested on 20 April 2003.

Jamal was released on 30 June 2020 from al-Hout prison in Dhi Qar.

References

External links

1955 births
Living people
People from Tikrit
Members of the Regional Command of the Arab Socialist Ba'ath Party – Iraq Region
Most-wanted Iraqi playing cards
Iraq War prisoners of war
Iraqi prisoners of war